David Sunley (born 6 February 1952) is an English former footballer who scored 44 goals in 324 appearances in the Football League playing for Sheffield Wednesday, Nottingham Forest, Hull City, Lincoln City and Stockport County. He played as a forward. He also played non-league football for Stafford Rangers.

In 1973, he was a member of the Football Association's touring party under the management of Sir Alf Ramsey that visited Gibraltar.

References

1952 births
Living people
People from Redcar and Cleveland
English footballers
Association football forwards
Sheffield Wednesday F.C. players
Nottingham Forest F.C. players
Hull City A.F.C. players
Lincoln City F.C. players
Stockport County F.C. players
Stafford Rangers F.C. players
English Football League players
Sportspeople from Yorkshire